Clemens Millauer (born 15 December 1994) is an Austrian snowboarder. He competed in the 2018 Winter Olympics.

References

1994 births
Living people
Snowboarders at the 2018 Winter Olympics
Snowboarders at the 2022 Winter Olympics
Austrian male snowboarders
Olympic snowboarders of Austria
People from Kirchdorf an der Krems
Sportspeople from Upper Austria